Mu Aquilae, Latinized from μ Aquilae, is the Bayer designation for a single star in the equatorial constellation of Aquila. With an apparent visual magnitude of 4.45, it is visible to the naked eye.

The stellar classification of Mu Aquilae is K3-IIIb Fe0.5, indicating that this is an evolved giant star with a mild overabundance of iron appearing in its spectrum. It belongs to a sub-category of giants called the red clump, which means it is generating energy through the fusion of helium at its core. Compared to the Sun, it has 116% of the mass and has expanded to 7.7 times the size. This inflated outer envelope has an effective temperature of 4,567 K and is radiating 24.5 times the Sun's luminosity. At this heat, Mu Aquilae glows with the orange hue of a K-type star. It is roughly seven billion years old.

References

External links
 HR 7429
 CCDM J19341+0723
 Image μ Aquilae

K-type giants
Horizontal-branch stars
Aquila (constellation)
Aquilae, Mu
BD+07 4132
Aquilae, 38
9661
184406
096229
7429